Demon Fighter is a 1983 Taiwanese film written by Gu Long. The film was directed by Chang Peng-i and starring Adam Cheng and Brigitte Lin. Alternative release titles for the film include: Orchids of Midnight; Night Orchid; Thirteen Moon Sword; Lone Ninja Warrior and Faster Blade Poisonous Darts.

Cast
Adam Cheng
Brigitte Lin
Tin Peng
Don Wong
Alan Chui Chung-San
Eddy Ko
Fung Hak-on
Lu I-chan
Cho Kin
Luk Yat-lung
Wong Fei-lung
Lung Fei

External links

1983 films
Taiwanese martial arts films
1980s Cantonese-language films
Wuxia films
Works based on Chu Liuxiang (novel series)
Films based on works by Gu Long